Zalesovo is the name of several rural localities in Russia:

Zalesovo, Altai Krai, a selo in Zalesovsky Selsoviet of Zalesovsky District of Altai Krai
Zalesovo, Orenburg Oblast, a selo in Zalesovsky Selsoviet of Krasnogvardeysky District of Orenburg Oblast
Zalesovo, Shokinskoye Rural Settlement, Kardymovsky District, Smolensk Oblast, a village in Shokinskoye Rural Settlement of Kardymovsky District of Smolensk Oblast
Zalesovo, Tyushinskoye Rural Settlement, Kardymovsky District, Smolensk Oblast, a village in Tyushinskoye Rural Settlement of Kardymovsky District of Smolensk Oblast
Zalesovo, Tula Oblast, a village in Kozlovsky Rural Okrug of Venyovsky District of Tula Oblast